John Dunne may refer to:

Religion
John Dunne (priest) (1816–1867), Irish priest and educator
John Dunne (bishop of Bathurst) (1845–1919), Roman Catholic bishop of Bathurst, New South Wales, Australia
John Dunne (bishop of Wilcannia) (1846–1916), Roman Catholic bishop of Wilcannia, New South Wales, Australia
John Charles Dunne (born 1937), American prelate of the Roman Catholic Church
John S. Dunne (1929–2013), Roman Catholic priest and theologian
John D. Dunne (born 1961), American author and professor of Buddhist Studies

Sports
John 'Tull' Dunne (1911–1990), Irish Gaelic footballer, coach and administrator
John Dunne (basketball) (born 1970), American college basketball coach
John Dunne, British rock climber featured in the film Hard Grit

Other
J. W. Dunne (1875–1949), British soldier, aeronautical engineer and philosopher
John Gregory Dunne (1932–2003), American novelist, screenwriter
John R. Dunne (1930–2020), American lawyer and politician
John Dunne (chief constable), chief constable of Cumberland and Westmorland

See also
John Donne (1572–1631), English metaphysical poet
John Dunn (disambiguation)